Argyresthia trifasciae is a moth of the family Yponomeutidae. It is found in North America, including California.

The wingspan is 7-7.5 mm. The forewings are shining white with a faint yellowish tinge, and marked with pale golden. The hindwings are pale yellow.

The larvae feed on Thuja occidentalis, as well as Juniperus and Cupressus species, including Cupressus macrocarpa.

References

Moths described in 1910
Argyresthia
Moths of North America